Reading Number Three is an unincorporated community and coal town in Somerset County, Pennsylvania, United States.

References

Unincorporated communities in Somerset County, Pennsylvania
Coal towns in Pennsylvania
Unincorporated communities in Pennsylvania